Jakub Cerven (born 8 April 2001) is a Slovak professional footballer who plays as a goalkeeper for Dolný Kubín.

Club career

MFK Ružomberok
Červeň made his Fortuna Liga debut for Ružomberok against Zemplín Michalovce on 20 March 2021.

Personal life
According to his social media communications, Červeň is a Christian.

References

External links
 MFK Ružomberok official club profile 
 Futbalnet profile 
 
 

2001 births
Living people
Slovak footballers
Slovak Christians
Association football goalkeepers
MFK Ružomberok players
MFK Dolný Kubín players
Slovak Super Liga players
2. Liga (Slovakia) players
3. Liga (Slovakia) players
Place of birth missing (living people)